Aristonicus (Aristonikos) was a tyrant of Methymnae in Lesbos in the 4th century BC. In 332, when the navarchs of Alexander the Great had already taken possession of the harbour of Chios, Aristonicus arrived during the night with some privateer ships, and entered it under the belief that it was still in the hands of the Persians. He was taken prisoner and delivered up to the Methymnians, who put him to death in a cruel manner.

References

Ancient Greek tyrants
People from ancient Lesbos
People associated with Alexander the Great
4th-century BC Greek people